The 1963 All-Pacific Coast football team consists of American football players chosen by the Associated Press (AP) and the United Press International (UPI) as the best college football players by position in the Pacific Coast region during the 1965 NCAA University Division football season.

Selections

Quarterbacks
 Craig Morton, California (AP-1 [back]; UPI-1 [quarterback])
 Bill Douglas, Washington (UPI-2)
 Bob Berry, Oregon (AP-2 [back]; UPI-3 [quarterback])

Halfbacks
 Mel Renfro, Oregon (AP-1 [back]; UPI-1 [halfback])
 Mike Garrett, USC (AP-2 [back]; UPI-1 [halfback])
 Willie Brown, USC (AP-1 [back]; UPI-2 [halfback])
 David Kopay, Washington (AP-2)
 Tom Blanchfield, California (UPI-2 [halfback])
 Walt Roberts, San Jose State (UPI-3 [halfback])
 Clancy Williams, Washington State (AP-2; UPI-3 [halfback])

Fullbacks
 Junior Coffey, Washington (AP-1 [back]; UPI-1 [fullback])
 Charlie Browning, Washington (UPI-2)
 Charlie Reed, Whitworth (UPI-3)

Ends
 Vern Burke, Oregon State (AP-1; UPI-1)
 Mel Profit, UCLA (AP-1; UPI-1)
 Dick Imwaile, Oregon (AP-2; UPI-3)
 Frank Patitucci, Stanford (AP-2; UPI-2)
 Gerry Shaw, Washington State (UPI-2)
 Neal Petties, San Diego State (UPI-3)

Tackles
 Mike Briggs, Washington (AP-1; UPI-1)
 Gary Kirner, USC (AP-1; UPI-1)
 Glenn Baker, Washington State (AP-2)
 Rick Koeper, Oregon State (AP-2; UPI-3)
 Larry Hansen, San Jose State (UPI-2)
 Al Hildebrand, Stanford (UPI-2)
 Ken Sugarman, Central Washington (UPI-3)

Guards
 Damon Bame, USC (AP-1; UPI-1)
 Rick Redman, Washington (AP-1; UPI-1)
 Rick Sortun, Washington (AP-2)
 John Walker, UCLA (AP-2)
 Walt Dathe, UCLA (UPI-2)
 Koll Hagen, Washington (UPI-2)
 Pete Dengeis, Linfield (UPI-3)
 Dave Wilcox, Oregon (UPI-3)

Centers
 Marv Harris, Stanford (AP-1; UPI-1)
 Larry Sagouspe, USC (AP-2; UPI-3)
 Jim Phillips, California (UPI-2)

Key
Bold – first-team pick by both AP and UPI

AP = Associated Press, selected from the ballots of football writers from the Northwest to southern California.

UPI = United Press International

See also
1963 College Football All-America Team

References

All-Pacific Coast Football Team
All-Pacific Coast football teams
All-Pac-12 Conference football teams